Newcastle Permanent Building Society was an Australian building society, and is now a brand of Newcastle Greater Mutual Group, as a result of a merger with Greater Bank.
Its head office is located in Newcastle, New South Wales, Australia.

History 

 1903 - Founded as a Starr-Bowkett Society in the Newcastle suburb of Wickham on 2 February 1903
 1939 - Newcastle Permanent Building Society was established
 1966 - First branch was opened to customers
 1970 - Introduced its famous ‘house’ logo
 1983 - Relocation of office headquarters to King St, Newcastle
 1984 - Installation of Newcastle Permanent's first ATM
 2001 - Internet banking was launched for Newcastle Permanent customers
 2004 - The Charitable Foundation distributed its first grant
 2018 - Celebrated 115 years of banking.
 2023 - Merged with Greater Bank

In November 2022, the society's members voted to merge the society with Greater Bank, to take effect in March 2023, provided regulatory approval.  Both brands were planned to continue.

Charitable Foundation  
The Charitable Foundations mission is to help those in need rewrite their futures and make a meaningful difference to individual's lives through grants. Since the Foundation's inception, more than $21.5m has been donated to the community through its bi-annual Charitable Grants process.

References

External links 
 

Building societies of Australia
Banks established in 1903
Companies based in Newcastle, New South Wales
Australian companies established in 1903